Appayanaickenpatti is a village panchayat located in Virudhunagar taluk in Virudhunagar district of the Indian state of Tamil Nadu. 

It is situated near the border of Tenkasi district (formerly a part of Tirunelveli Dt) there are two rivers encroaching the village one is locally known as East river(கிழக்கு ஆறு) the other is known as North river(வடக்கு ஆறு). The former has an old Dam the latter has a new Dam.

It hosts some 500 residents. Appayanaickenpatti is a developing industrial site, hosting a paper mill, and a match box factory.

There is a library near that temple. Near the North river There is one Colony know locally as Ambedkar Nagar( Thendral Nagar).

Education
It hosts a government primary school and higher secondary school located in separate campus areas. On the banks of North river there situated St. Antony's High school (A Don Bosco institution under Trichy State) The School is popularly known as Aathupalam School (Aathu_ஆறு-river; paalam-பாலம்-bridge).

Adjacent communities

Reference  

Villages in Virudhunagar district